The Des Moines Civic Center is a 2,744-seat performing arts center belonging to Des Moines Performing Arts located in Des Moines, Iowa.  It has been Iowa's largest theater since it opened on June 10, 1979, and is used for concerts, Broadway shows, ballets, and other special events.

The Civic Center building is also home to the 200-seat Stoner Theater, used for smaller theatrical shows and lectures, located on street level.

Cowles Commons, formerly Nollen Plaza, is the one square block space located west of the Civic Center. Cowles Commons opened in June 2015, and hosts several events throughout the year.

Together with the Stoner Theater, Cowles Commons, and the nearby Temple for Performing Arts, the Civic Center is part of the Des Moines Performing Arts.

History
In 1972, the KRNT Theater closed. The loss of the 45-year-old theater left downtown Des Moines without a major cultural venue. A group of community leaders attempted to pass a referendum to construct a theater in 1974, but, needing 60% approval, it received only 54% and failed. After the narrow defeat, Des Moines business leaders decided to form a privately held, not-for-profit corporation to build and run a performing arts facility. The city's largest fundraising effort at the time raised $9.3 million to build the Civic Center in fewer than 90 days.

After an introductory open house on June 10, 1979, the first public performance was by the Des Moines Ballet on June 14. The Civic Center is noted for its acoustics, and is handicapped-accessible. All seats are on one level.

Backstage there are ten dressing rooms.

In 1997, a staging of The Phantom of the Opera welcomed more than 100,000 visitors during a five-week run, proving to many that Des Moines could support bigger shows.

The 2012-13 Broadway series sold over 133,000 tickets.

Series
 Willis Broadway Series
 Des Moines Symphony
 The Dance Series
 Wellmark Family Series
 Applause Series
 Temple Comedy Series
 Live at the Temple Concert Series
 Lunch Unplugged
 Smart Talk Connected Conversations

References

External links
Official Site

Concert halls in the United States
Buildings and structures in Des Moines, Iowa
Buildings and structures completed in 1979
Tourist attractions in Des Moines, Iowa
Performing arts centers in Iowa